Shamila Batohi is a South African prosecutor and the national director of public prosecutions (NDPP) at the National Prosecuting Authority.

Education
Batohi completed high school at Burnwood Secondary School in Clare Estate. She completed her bachelor's degree at the University of Durban-Westville and post-graduate at the University of Natal.

Career
Batohi led the prosecution of Proteas cricket captain Hansie Cronje at the King Commission of Inquiry in 2000, and served as director of public prosecutions for KwaZulu-Natal from 2000 to 2009.

She served as senior legal advisor to the prosecutor at the International Criminal Court from 2009 to 2018.

On 4 December 2018, she was appointed national director of public prosecutions by President Cyril Ramaphosa, and assumed the office on 1 February 2019.

References 

Living people
South African women lawyers
People from Durban
University of Durban-Westville alumni
University of Natal alumni
International Criminal Court prosecutors
Year of birth missing (living people)
20th-century South African lawyers
21st-century South African lawyers